The Glassworks-Core House, also known as the Reppert/Kramer House and Building 302B, is an historic home which is located in Monongahela Township in Greene County, Pennsylvania. 

It was listed on the National Register of Historic Places in 1995.

History and architectural features
Built circa 1820, the Glassworks-Core House is a two-and-one-half-story, three-bay, vernacular, timber-frame dwelling. It has an "I"-plan, rear kitchen addition, and a shed roofed porch that was added during the twentieth century. The house was possibly built as part of the "New Geneva Glass Works Lot."

It was listed on the National Register of Historic Places in 1995.

References 

Houses on the National Register of Historic Places in Pennsylvania
Houses completed in 1820
Houses in Greene County, Pennsylvania
National Register of Historic Places in Greene County, Pennsylvania